The East Turkistan Education and Solidarity Association (ETESA) is a Uyghur Islamist organisation based in Istanbul, Turkey.

The government of China has accused the group of having ties to the Turkistan Islamic Party (formerly known as the East Turkestan Islamic Movement or ETIM), a claim it denies.

Purpose 
The ETESA states that their purpose is to "educate and bring up Turkistani (Turkic) Muslims" by "meeting their Islamic, social, cultural, spiritual and earthly needs".

See also 
 East Turkestan independence movement
 Xinjiang conflict

References 

East Turkestan independence movement
Secessionist organizations in Asia